Joseph Taylor Bentley (6 March 1906 – 16 June 1993) was the tenth general superintendent of the Young Men's Mutual Improvement Association of the Church of Jesus Christ of Latter-day Saints (LDS Church) from 1958 to 1962.

Born in Colonia Juárez, Chihuahua, Mexico, Bentley graduated from Brigham Young University and worked as a teacher and educational administrator in the U.S. state of Utah and Mexico. In 1953, he began teaching in the accounting department at BYU and eventually became an assistant to Ernest L. Wilkinson, the president of the university.

In 1956, Bentley became the first president of the Northern Mexican Mission of the LDS Church, which was created by dividing the Mexican Mission.

In 1958, Bentley succeeded Elbert R. Curtis and became general superintendent of the LDS Church's YMMIA. He served for four years, until he was succeeded in 1962 by his first assistant G. Carlos Smith. Bentley's other assistants during his tenure included Carl W. Buehner and future LDS Church apostles Alvin R. Dyer and Marvin J. Ashton.

In 1972, Bentley was appointed the president of the newly created Argentina East Mission, which was created by dividing Argentina into two missions.  In 1976 Bentley was called as first counselor in the Provo Temple presidency.

Bentley married to Kathleen Bench in the Salt Lake Temple in 1928. Bench died in 1998, four years after Bentley.

Notes

References
Arnold K. Garr, Donald Q. Cannon & Richard O. Cowan (eds.) (2000). Encyclopedia of Latter-day Saint History (Salt Lake City, Utah: Deseret Book)

1906 births
1993 deaths
Brigham Young University alumni
Brigham Young University faculty
General Presidents of the Young Men (organization)
Mexican emigrants to the United States
Mexican leaders of the Church of Jesus Christ of Latter-day Saints
Mexican Mormon missionaries
Mission presidents (LDS Church)
Mormon missionaries in Argentina
Mormon missionaries in Mexico
People from Colonia Juárez, Chihuahua
20th-century Mormon missionaries
Mexican expatriates in Argentina